The 15th Film Critics Circle of Australia Awards, 2006, honoured the best in film for 2006.

Winners
Best Film 
Ten Canoes (Rolf de Heer, Julie Ryan)
Best Director 
Ray Lawrence (Jindabyne)
Best Actress 
Abbie Cornish (Candy)
Best Actor
Shane Jacobson (Kenny)
Best Original Screenplay 
Shane Jacobson and Clayton Jacobson (Kenny)
Best Adapted Screenplay 
Beatrix Christian (Jindabyne)
Best Cinematography 
Ian Jones, Ten Canoes David Williamson (Jindabyne)
Best Editing 
Tania Nehme (Ten Canoes)
Best Actor — Supporting Role 
Geoffrey Rush (Candy)
Best Actress — Supporting Role 
Deborra-Lee Furness (Jindabyne)
Best Music Score: 
Cezary Skubiszewski (The Book of Revelation)
Best Foreign Language Film 
Caché (Hidden) (Director: Michael Haneke, France)
Best Foreign Film – English Language
Good Night, and Good Luck. (Director: George Clooney)
Best Australian Short Film 
Stranded (dir: Stuart McDonald; Producers: Lizzette Atkins, Beth Frey)
Best Short Documentary (Under 60 Min) 
The Balanda And The Bark Canoes (Directors: Molly Reynolds, Tania Nehme, Rolf De Heer; Producers: Rolf De Heer, Julie Ryan)
Best Feature Documentary 
The Archive Project (Director: John Hughes; Producers: John Hughes, Philippa Campey
Hunt Angels (Director: Alec Morgan; Producer: Sue Maslin)

References

 Film Critics Circle Of Australia

Film Critics Circle of Australia Awards
2006 in Australian cinema
2006 film awards